The Letter is a 2019 Kenyan documentary film directed by Maia Lekow and Chris King. It was selected as the Kenyan entry for the Best International Feature Film at the 93rd Academy Awards, but it was not nominated.

Synopsis
A young man visits his grandmother's village to find out she has been accused of witchcraft.

See also
 List of submissions to the 93rd Academy Awards for Best International Feature Film
 List of Kenyan submissions for the Academy Award for Best International Feature Film

References

External links
 

2019 films
2019 documentary films
Kenyan documentary films
Swahili-language films